BeoCom is a line of telephones manufactured by Bang & Olufsen. Between the BeoCom 1 (also known in some markets as BeoCom 6000) and the BeoCom 2 phones there is much interoperability. The current versions of these telephones use independent wireless base stations known by the name BeoLine. The Mark 1 version of the BeoLine PSTN base can support up to six BeoCom handsets. the Mark 2 version of the Beoline PSTN base can support eight BeoCom handsets.

BeoCom 1000 
BeoCom 1000 (as shown in image) was designed by Gideon Loewy (Lindinger-Loewy Industrial Design ApS., Copenhagen Denmark, now Scandinavian Design Consultant Company Ltd., Taiwan) in 1983, launched on the market in 1985 and withdrawn in 2003.

BeoCom 2000 

The BeoCom 2000 used an integrated Toshiba TMP47C452AN microcontroller and could store up to 20 phone numbers.

BeoCom 2200 
The BeoCom 2200, also named BeoCom Copenhagen was designed in 1986 by Lindinger-Loewy.

BeoCom 1 
The BeoCom 1 is a model of cordless telephone designed by Henrik Sørig Thomsen.  The handset is 159 mm (6¼ inches) in length, 51 mm (2 inches) wide, and weighs 170 g (6 oz).  It transmits its signals at 2.4 gigahertz.

The BeoCom 1 is the phone that is used to connect Howie Mandel to the Banker on the US version of Deal or No Deal.

An identical-looking model known as the BeoCom 6000 is sold in non-US markets, and it uses the DECT standards. The round wheel on the phone formed an inspiration for Apple in the design of the first iPods.

BeoCom 2 
The BeoCom 2 is a model of cordless telephone from 2002 designed by David Lewis.  The handset is 321mm (≈1 foot) in length with base, and weighs 220 g (≈7.7 oz).  It transmits its signals at 2.4 gigahertz in North America, and using DECT frequencies elsewhere.  Production of the North American model was discontinued in 2012.

BeoLine PSTN and BeoLine ISDN 
The BeoLine is the wireless telephone base station for the BeoCom handsets, designed to connect multiple handsets to an external telephone line. The BeoLine provides a simple PBX, which can route calls to different handsets, and can permit internal calls between handsets. Handsets and base station can share a common Phonebook of up to 200 names-and-numbers. The Mark 1 version of BeoLine was made in two variants: one to connect to a traditional analogue PSTN service, and one to connect to an ISDN service. The Mark 1 BeoLine can support up to six BeoCom handsets of different types (provided that the BeoLine software has been brought sufficiently up-to-date). The Mark 2 BeoLine can support eight BeoCom handsets, but only those of recent manufacture.

References

External links 

Telephones in B&O Produkt Archive
BeoCom 1 at Bang & Olufsen's website (archive-link)
BeoCom 2 at Bang & Olufsen's website (archive-link)

Bang & Olufsen
Consumer electronics